Ondonga Airfield is a former World War II airfield on New Georgia in the Solomon Islands archipelago.

History

World War II

The Munda Point area was secured on 5 August 1943. While the rehabilitation and expansion of Munda Point Airfield was the first priority for the Seebees, the 37th and 82nd Naval Construction Battalions soon began building another fighter airfield on Ondonga Island across from Munda Point. Construction proceeded with difficulty as the island was covered with dense jungle over bog and the site was periodically shelled by Japanese artillery on Kolombangara Island and bombed by Japanese aircraft flying from Bougainville. After 25 days the Seebees had completed a coral-surfaced  by  fighter runway. By February 1944 the Seebees had completed a second parallel runway, roads, taxiways, hardstands, a control tower and a 12,000 barrel tank farm.

Royal New Zealand Air Force units based at Ondonga included:
14 Squadron operating P-40 Kittyhawks from November–December 1943
15 Squadron operating P-40s from October–November 1943 and December 1943-January 1944
16 Squadron operating P-40s from November 1943-January 1944
17 Squadron operating P-40s January 1944
18 Squadron operating P-40s from October–November 1943

US Navy units based at Ondonga included:
VF-17 operating F4Us
VF-33 operating F6Fs
VP-12 operating PBYs

USMC units based at Ondonga included:
VMF-216 operating F4Us

Postwar
The airfield is abandoned and overgrown with vegetation.

See also
Barakoma Airfield
Munda Airport
United States Army Air Forces in the South Pacific Area

References

Airfields in the Pacific theatre of World War II
Airfields of the United States Navy
Military installations closed in the 1940s
World War II sites in the Solomon Islands
Closed installations of the United States Navy